The following is a list of notable past pupils of Sydney Grammar School (SGS). Former pupils of the School are known as Old Sydneians.

Politics, public service and the law

Lawyers

High Court of Australia
 Sir Edmund Barton (1859–1864), former Justice of the High Court of Australia and the first Prime Minister of Australia
 William Gummow, former Justice of the High Court of Australia
 Sir Anthony Mason, former Chief Justice of the High Court of Australia and Chancellor of the University of New South Wales
 Sir Richard O'Connor (1867), former Justice of the High Court of Australia and politician
 Albert Piddington, former Justice of the High Court of Australia
 Sir George Rich, former Justice of the High Court of Australia
 Sir Victor Windeyer, former Justice of the High Court of Australia

Federal Court of Australia

 James Allsop AO, current Chief Justice of the Federal Court of Australia

Supreme Court of New South Wales
 Sir Leslie Herron, former Chief Justice of the Supreme Court of New South Wales
 Kim Santow, former Justice of the Supreme Court of New South Wales Court of Appeal, and a former Chancellor of the University of Sydney
 Sir Kenneth Street, former Chief Justice of the Supreme Court of New South Wales
 Sir Philip Street, former Chief Justice of the Supreme Court of New South Wales

Other notable lawyers
 Alan Blow AO, current Chief Justice of Tasmania and Lieutenant-Governor of Tasmania
 Sir Norman Cowper, former lawyer. businessman, and administrator

Politicians

Australian parliament
 Sir Edmund Barton (1859–1864), the first Prime Minister of Australia; Justice of the High Court of Australia
 Peter Baume, former Senator for New South Wales; physician; Chancellor of the Australian National University
 Max Falstein, Member for Watson (1940–1949) in the Australian House of Representatives
 Paul Fletcher, current minister in the Morrison Government and Minister for Communications, Cyber Safety and the Arts
 Sir William McMahon (In Office 10 March 1971 – 5 December 1972), 20th Prime Minister of Australia
 Harold Thorby, former Member for Calare in the Australian House of Representatives and NSW government minister
 Malcolm Turnbull, 29th Prime Minister of Australia

New South Wales parliament
 Sir George Fuller, former Premier of New South Wales
 Alex Greenwich, the current Member for Sydney
 Sir Norman Kater, politician, medical practitioner and grazier
 James Macarthur-Onslow, member of both the Legislative Assembly and the Legislative Council; Australian Army Major General; later a businessman
 John Maddison, former Attorney General of New South Wales
 Harold Thorby, former NSW government minister and Member for Calare in the Australian House of Representatives
 Andrew Tink, former politician, historian and author

Other state parliaments
Alan Cobcroft, former member of the Legislative Council of Samoa
 John Fletcher, former Member of the Queensland Legislative Assembly and cricketer
 Charles Mein (1857–1859), justice of the Supreme Court of Queensland, Member of the Queensland Legislative Council
 Sir Boyd Dunlop Morehead, former Premier of Queensland

Local government and community activism
 George Newhouse, former Mayor of Waverley Municipal Council
 Brett Solomon, co-founder of accessnow.org

Public servants
 Nicholas Cowdery, former Director of Public Prosecutions in New South Wales.
 Sir Robert Garran, former lawyer and first Solicitor-General of Australia
 Sir Hubert Murray, former Lieutenant-Governor of the Territory of Papua and boxer

Military service
 General John Antill, Australian Army Major General during World War I 
 Clive Caldwell, Royal Australian Air Force World War II ace fighter pilot
 General Sir Harry Chauvel, Australian Army Chief of Staff
 General John Grey, Australian Army Chief and Chancellor of James Cook University
 James Gordon Legge, Australian Army Lieutenant General during World War I
 James Macarthur-Onslow, Australian Army Major General during the Second Boer War and World War I, and later politician and businessman
 Henry Normand MacLaurin, Australian Army Brigadier General during World War I

Humanities

Academia
 Henry Kingsley Archdall, academic and clergyman
 Sir Christopher Clark, academic and Regius Professor of History at the University of Cambridge
 Alec Hill, historian
 Dr Stephen Spurr, headmaster at the Westminster School
 E G Waterhouse, linguist, professor of German at Sydney University, plant breeder

Social sciences
 Hugh Mackay, social commentator and former Chairman of Trustees of Sydney Grammar School
 Malcolm Mackerras, psephologist

Media and journalism
 George Blaikie, author and journalist
 Richard Carleton, reporter with the Australian edition of 60 Minutes
 Charles Firth, member of The Chaser comedy team
 Bruce Gyngell, first man to appear on Australian television
 Richard Kingsmill, broadcaster with the Australian Broadcasting Corporation
 Dominic Knight, member of The Chaser comedy team
 Chas Licciardello, member of The Chaser comedy team
 Tim Palmer, journalist with the Australian Broadcasting Corporation
 Siimon Reynolds, Australian advertising executive who developed the Grim Reaper advertisement for AIDS awareness
 Nicholas Stuart, author and journalist
 Jonathan Swan, journalist with Axios

Business
 Len Ainsworth, founder of Aristocrat Leisure Limited
 Demetrius Comino, engineer, inventor and philanthropist
 Sir James Oswald Fairfax (1863–1928), newspaper proprietor
 Sir James Reading Fairfax (1834–1919), newspaper proprietor
 David Gonski, current Chairman of the Future Fund, Coca-Cola Amatil, Australia Council chairman, and Chancellor of the University of New South Wales
 Simon Hannes, Macquarie Bank executive who was convicted of insider trading
 Sir Samuel Hordern, a director of Anthony Hordern & Sons
 Steven Lowy, co-Chief Executive Officer of Westfield Corporation

Sport

Athletics
 Slip Carr, Australian Olympian sprinter (1924)
 Lachlan Renshaw, Australian Olympian middle distance runner (2008)

Boxing
 Sir Hubert Murray (1872–1877), English Amateur Heavyweight Boxing Champion; Lieutenant-Governor of the Territory of Papua

Cricket
 Eric Barbour, NSW cricketer with 23 first class matches and 1,577 runs
 Sir Edmund Barton (1859–1864), first class umpire; first Prime Minister of Australia
 Jim Burke, Australian international with 24 tests and 1,280 runs
 Albert Cotter, Australian international with 21 tests and 89 wickets
 John Fletcher, Queensland cricketer with 3 first class matches and 97 runs
 Sir Norman Gregg, NSW cricketer with 3 first class matches and 116 runs
 Hunter Hendry, Australian international with 11 tests and 335 runs
 Sammy Jones, Australian international with 12 tests and 428 runs
 Alan McGilvray, NSW cricketer with 20 first class matches and 684 runs, most notable for his cricket radio broadcasting
 William Robison, NSW cricketer with 1 first class match and 15 runs
 Fred Spofforth, Australian international with 18 tests and 94 wickets; first test cricketer to take a hat-trick
 Alan Walker, NSW and Nottingham cricketer with 94 first class matches and 221 wickets; also played for Australia in rugby union
 Sammy Woods, Australian and England international with 6 tests and 10 wickets; also played for England in rugby union

Rowing
 Mervyn Finlay, Australian Olympian (1952; 1 bronze medal)
 Joe Gould, Australian Olympian (1936)
 Frederick Septimus Kelly, British Olympian (1908; 1 gold medal)
 Vic Middleton, Australian Olympian (1952)
 Hugh Ward, Australasian Olympian (1912); soldier who was awarded the Military Cross and two Bars
 Stuart Welch, Australian dual Olympian (2000 and 2004; 1 silver medal, 1 bronze medal)

Rugby league
 Dallas Hodgins, North Sydney Bears player
 Nick Pappas (1969–1978), Chairman of South Sydney Rabbitohs

Rugby union
 Malcolm Blair, Australian international with 3 caps and 0 points
 Ernie Carr, Australian international with 6 caps and 3 points;  brother of Slip Carr
 Slip Carr, Australian international with 4 caps and 9 points; Australian Olympic athlete; brother of Ernie Carr
 Tim Clark, Australian sevens international
 Cam Crawford, NSW Waratahs and ACT Brumbies player with 13 Super Rugby caps and 40 points
 Emile de Lissa, President, Barbarian F.C.
 David Emanuel, Australian international with 9 caps and 0 points
 Arthur Finlay, Australian international with 12 caps and 0 points
 Charlie Fox, Australian international with 17 caps and 6 points; also the Australian captain
 Charles Hammand, Australian international with 2 caps and 0 points
 Bill Hemingway, Australian international with 5 caps and 9 points
 Julian Huxley, Australian international with 9 caps and 22 points
 Wal Ives, Australian international with 5 caps and 0 points
 Doug Keller, Australian and Scotland international with 13 caps and 0 points; also Scottish captain
 Bob Loudon, Australian international with 13 caps and 12 points; Australian captain; brother of Darby Loudon
 Darby Loudon, Australian international with 4 caps and 5 points; Australian captain; brother of Bob Loudon
 Jack Maddocks Current player for the Melbourne Rebels, played for Australian Under-20s
 Hyam Marks (1886–1892), Australian international with 2 caps and 0 points; played in first ever test
 Andrew Mower, Scotland international with 13 caps and 0 points
 Walter Phipps, Australian international with 1 cap and 0 points
 Roland Raymond, Australian international with 13 caps and 30 points
 Alex Ross, Australian international with 20 caps and 43 points; also the Australian captain
 Geoff Storey, Australian international with 8 caps and 0 points
 Alan Walker, Australian international with 5 caps and 3 points; also a first class cricketer
 Alfred Walker, Australian international with 16 caps and 9 points; also the Australian captain
 Johnnie Wallace, Australia and Scotland international with 17 caps and 48 points; also the Australian captain
 Clarrie Wallach, Australian international with 5 caps and 0 points
 Colin Windon, Australian international with 20 caps and 33 points; also the Australian captain
 Sammy Woods, England international with 13 caps and 6 points; also an international for Australia and England in cricket

Swimming
 Boy Charlton, Australian Olympian (1924, 1928 and 1932; 1 gold medal, 3 silver medals, 1 bronze medal)
 Frederick Lane, Australian Olympian (1900; 2 gold medals); Australia's first Olympic swimmer

Tennis
 John Newcombe, seven-time Grand Slam winner

Other sports
 Andrew Lock, Australian mountaineer
 Rohan Chapman-Davies, Australian Olympic mogul skier
 Jim Ferrier, golfer

Arts

Performing arts

Film and theatre
 Dr Richard James Allen, writer, director and choreographer (Thursday's Fictions 2006 and numerous short films)
 Stephan Elliott, writer and director (The Adventures of Priscilla, Queen of the Desert 1994)
 Richard Francis-Bruce, Academy Award-nominated film editor (The Shawshank Redemption 1994, Seven 1995, Air Force One 1997)
 Andrew Lesnie, Academy Award-winning cameraman  (The Lord of the Rings: The Fellowship of the Ring 2002)
 John Meillon, film, television and voice actor (Crocodile Dundee, Crocodile Dundee II)
 Gregan McMahon, actor and theatrical producer
 Julian McMahon (1973–1986), actor; son of Prime Minister McMahon
 Charles 'Bud' Tingwell, film and theatre actor

Music
 Alexander Briger, conductor
 Nigel Butterley, composer
 Tim Derricourt, songwriter for indie rock group Dappled Cities and current English master at Sydney Grammar School
 Ross Edwards, composer
 Sam Fischer, singer-songwriter
 Rob Hirst, drummer for Midnight Oil
 Sir Charles Mackerras, conductor
 Antony Walker (1980–1985), conductor

Visual arts
 Charles Bryant, visual artist
 Max Dupain, photographer
 Donald Friend, visual artist and author

Writing and poetry
 Dr Richard James Allen, poet, dancer, choreographer and director
 John Le Gay Brereton, poet and professor of English
 Michael Dransfield, poet
 Joseph Jacobs, folklorist and literary critic best known for preserving fairy-tales such as Jack and the Beanstalk and The Three Little Pigs
 Dowell Philip O'Reilly, poet and short story writer
 Banjo Paterson, poet and journalist

Science and medicine
 Dr Bryan Gaensler, Young Australian of the Year, 1999; former assistant professor of astronomy at Harvard University; current professor at the University of Sydney
 Dr Rowan Gillies, former international president of Médecins Sans Frontières
 Sir Norman McAlister Gregg, ophthalmologist who discovered the link between maternal rubella and birth defects
 Edward Rennie, chemist

See also
 List of non-government schools in New South Wales
Athletic Association of the Great Public Schools of New South Wales

References

External links
 Sydney Grammar School website
 The Old Sydneians Union

 
Sydney Grammar
Sydney Grammar
Lists of Australian men